Eosphagnum inretortum is a species of moss, and the only species of the genus Eosphagnum. Originally described as a species of Sphagnum, it is now a separate genus on the basis of morphological and genetic differences.

References

External links

Sphagnales
Monotypic moss genera